The Odisha Public Service Commission (OPSC) is the state agency authorized to conduct the Civil Services Examination for entry-level appointments to the various civil services of Odisha. It advises the Government of Odisha on all matters relating to the rules of recruitment, appointment, transfer, promotion, professional standards and disciplinary action of civil servants. In this capacity, the commission organize recruitment procedures, competitive examinations and screening tests, and candidate interview boards for the appointment of officers to civil service and civil posts within the state.

History 
The recommendations of the Royal Commission on superior services in India, 1949 are referred to in short as the Lee Commission. They were added to the Constitution of India as Articles 315 to 323. OPSC was constituted on 1 April 1949 after its bifurcation from the former Bihar and Odisha Joint Public Service Commission. At the time of creation, the Odisha Public Service Commission had three members, including a chairman. The membership increased to five in 1979 and further increased to six in 1996.

Functions 
The functions of the Commission are divided into the following four categories:

 Advice on the framing of recruitment rules and amendments with regard to the recruitment and conditions of service of Group 'B' posts/services carrying scale of pay of Rs. 6500-200-10,500/- and above and Group 'A' posts/services.

 Advice on punishment proposed by the disciplinary authority in finalization of departmental proceedings under the Odisha Civil Services (Classification, Control & Appeal) Rules, 1962 read with Rule 7 of the Odisha Civil Services (Pension) Rules, 1992.

 Advice on matters relating to promotion of officers and fixation of inter-seniority, etc., with regard to officers of Group 'B' carrying a pay scale of Rs. 6500-200-10,500/- and above and all Group 'A' officers.

 Recruitment of candidates to posts/services belonging to Group 'B' and above under the State Government.

 Through competitive examination and viva vice test as prescribed in the recruitment rules; and

 Through viva vice test only.

Examinations 
List of examinations conducted by the Odisha Public Service Commission:
 Odisha Civil Service Examination
 Odisha Judicial Service Examination
 Odisha Education Services
 Odisha Statistics & Economics Service
 Odisha Municipality Administration Service
 Junior Lecturers in O.E.S.
 Asst. Section Officer
 Assistant Conservator of Forests and Forest Ranger
 Asst. Executive Engineer (Civil & Mechanical)
 Asst. Executive Engineer (Electrical)
 Junior Assistant in the Office of OPSC
 Assistant Soil Conservation Officer
 Assistant Agriculture Officer
 Assistant Agriculture Engineer
 Assistant Horticulture Officer
 Assistant Fisheries Officer
 Odisha Technical Education and training service.
 Medical Officers .
 Ayurvedic medical officers.
Homeopathy Medical Officers.
 Odisha Mining and Geology service .

Delays in announcing examination results 
OPSC was criticized for not conducting examinations on time due to various cases pending with State Administrative Tribunal (SAT) and Odisha High Court. The final result of Odisha Civil Service, 2011 was declared only in February, 2016. It has been more than four years since the advertisement and nine months since the examination for Assistant Section Officer, but OPSC has been unable to decide the date of the result announcement. Questions were raised by the candidates who contested for the post. They claim that if OPSC was not so hurried in the recruitment process, they could have advertised the vacancy in 2017 or later.

See also

 List of Public service commissions in India

References

External links 
 

State agencies of Odisha
State public service commissions of India
1949 establishments in Orissa
Government agencies established in 1949